Pyrgulopsis aardahli, commonly known as the Benton Valley springsnail, is a species of freshwater snails in the family Hydrobiidae.

This species' natural habitat is springs.  It is endemic to a spring on the Bramlette Ranch, Mono County, California, United States.

Description
Its differentiated from other Pyrgulopsis in that its penis has a very small lobe and short filament with the penial ornament consisting of a small, circular terminal gland and a stalked ventral gland.

References

aardahli
Molluscs of the United States
Endemic fauna of California
Freshwater animals of North America
Gastropods described in 1989